Francisco Santos Mir III (born May 24, 1979), is an American mixed martial artist who most recently competed for Bellator MMA in the Heavyweight division. He formerly competed in the Ultimate Fighting Championship (UFC) for sixteen years. A former two-time UFC Heavyweight Champion, he holds the record for the most finishes and the most submission victories in UFC Heavyweight history. Mir possessed the longest uninterrupted tenure of any fighter in UFC history, competing for the company from 2001 to 2016. He was the first man to knock out and the first to submit Antônio Rodrigo Nogueira.

Background
Born and raised in Las Vegas, Nevada, Mir began training and competing in American Kenpo at a school owned by his parents, earning his black belt as a teenager. Mir's father played a major role in convincing him to begin wrestling on the basis that it could help him avoid submissions. Mir joined the wrestling team at Bonanza High School during his junior year and lost his first nine matches. During his senior year (1998) he went 44–1 and won the state championship. Mir played fullback and defensive end on the school's football team, which reached the Southern Zone semifinals in 1997.

Career
Mir met UFC matchmaker Joe Silva at a Brazilian jiu-jitsu (BJJ) school. Silva saw potential in Mir and suggested that he compete in mixed martial arts. Mir made his professional debut against Jerome Smith at HOOKnSHOOT: Showdown on July 14, 2001. Mir won the bout by unanimous decision after two rounds. He won his second fight by triangle choke in the first round, against Dan Quinn at IFC Warriors Challenge 15 on August 31, 2001.

Ultimate Fighting Championship
On November 2, 2001, at UFC 34: High Voltage, Mir made his UFC debut against 6th degree BJJ black belt Roberto Traven. Traven had previously competed in the UFC (at UFC 11) and was the 1999 ADCC Submission Wrestling World Championship open class champion. Mir defeated Traven by armbar at 1:05 of round one, earning "Tapout of the Night" in the process. Mir's next UFC match was against Lion's Den fighter and eight-time UFC veteran Pete Williams at UFC 36: Worlds Collide on March 22, 2002. Mir submitted Williams in 46 seconds with an inside shoulder lock that has since been named after himself. It was the only submission loss of Williams' career.

Mir faced Ian Freeman in London, England, at UFC 38: Brawl at the Hall on July 13, 2002. Despite several leglock attempts by Mir, Freeman achieved side control four minutes into the first round and landed numerous punches and elbows to Mir's head. A time out was called due to a cut on Mir's face. After Freeman separated, the referee signaled to Mir to stand back up and stopped the fight after Mir struggled to do so.

Mir then faced Tank Abbott at UFC 41 on February 28, 2003. Mir submitted Abbott with a toe hold in 46 seconds. On June 26, 2003, Mir fought Wes Sims at UFC 43: Meltdown. Mir won by disqualification at 2:55 of the first round after Sims stomped on Mir's jaw following a slam escape of an armbar attempt by Mir. They would rematch at UFC 46: Supernatural on January 31, 2004. Mir won by knockout at 4:21 of the second round.

Heavyweight championship
On June 19, 2004, Mir faced Tim Sylvia for the vacant UFC Heavyweight Championship at UFC 48: Payback. Referee Herb Dean stopped the fight 50 seconds into the first round after Mir broke Sylvia's right forearm with a straight armbar. Sylvia initially protested the call but relented following a replay of the break. He was taken to a nearby hospital where an x-ray showed that his arm was broken in four places, two in both the radius and ulna bones of his right forearm. Sylvia underwent surgery later that week. Mir earned his BJJ black belt from Ricardo Pires following this performance.

Motorcycle injury
On September 17, 2004, Mir was knocked off his motorcycle by a car. The accident caused two breaks in Mir's femur and tore all the ligaments in his knee. An Interim Heavyweight Championship was created while Mir recovered from surgery, which Andrei Arlovski won by defeating Tim Sylvia via first round submission. On August 12, 2005, the UFC learned that Mir would not be able to face Andrei Arlovski in October as scheduled and stripped him of the title after 14 months, promoting Arlovski to undisputed UFC Heavyweight Champion. In 2010, Mir told FIGHT! Magazine that he was grateful for the accident as it gave him time to be with his wife.

Return to the UFC
In his first bout since the accident, Mir fought 4th degree BJJ black belt and six-time Mundials Champion Márcio Cruz at UFC 57: Liddell vs. Couture 3 on February 4, 2006. In a shocking upset, Mir was defeated by first-round TKO. He returned to the octagon on July 8, 2006, at UFC 61: Bitter Rivals against Dan Christison. Mir won by unanimous decision when all three judges scored the bout 29–28. Mir was widely criticized following the bout due to his sloppy appearance and inability to finish a seemingly mismatched opponent. Despite the criticism, Mir was subsequently matched with Brandon Vera at UFC 65: Bad Intentions to determine the number one contender. Mir showed improved striking ability but was quickly stunned by a straight right from Vera, who then dropped him with knees from the Muay Thai clinch. Vera then secured side control and delivered a number of punches and elbows, forcing the referee to stop the fight at 1:09 of the first round. While preparing for UFC 140, Mir attributed his poor performance in his initial return bouts to lingering health issues following the accident.

Rise back to title contention
Mir was scheduled to fight kickboxer Antoni Hardonk at UFC Fight Night 9 on April 5, 2007, but had to drop out due to a shoulder injury. He faced Hardonk at UFC 74 and won via kimura at 1:17 of the first round. At the end of the bout, Mir walked to the cameras pointing at himself saying "I'm back!". Frank's wife Jennifer was shown on the replay screaming and crying with joy when Frank secured the kimura and the fight was stopped.

On February 2, 2008, at UFC 81, Mir welcomed former WWE wrestler Brock Lesnar to the octagon for Lesnar's highly anticipated debut. It took Lesnar less than 10 seconds to shoot for a takedown and muscle Mir to the mat. However, seconds after Lesnar began to unload strikes from Mir's half guard, referee Steve Mazzagatti controversially deemed that there were some illegal punches landed to the back of Mir's head, drawing a foul and a one-point deduction.  The fighters were ordered to stand up, and Mir was given a brief recovery period. As the fight resumed, Mir was almost instantly dropped with a big punch from Lesnar. Lesnar continued to land punches on Mir and shucked off Mir's armbar attempt before moving to a stacked guard. It was here that Mir caught Lesnar with a kneebar, causing Lesnar to tap out at 1:30 of the first round. Mir was awarded with Submission of the Night honors.

The Ultimate Fighter season 8
Spike TV announced on May 12, 2008, that former UFC champion Frank Mir would face off with the current UFC Interim Heavyweight Champion and former PRIDE Heavyweight Champion Antônio Rodrigo Nogueira as the coaches for the eighth season of The Ultimate Fighter. The season, which premiered on Spike TV on September 17, returned to the two weight class format. It featured Light heavyweight and Lightweight fighters. Production on season eight began in late May, with the entire cast announced in September, and concluded in December.

Second heavyweight championship
Mir fought his fellow Ultimate Fighter coach, Antônio Rodrigo Nogueira, at UFC 92 for the Interim UFC Heavyweight Championship. This bout was part of a mini-Heavyweight tournament, often hyped by UFC president Dana White. The winner of this fight would then face the winner of the match between the Heavyweight Champion Randy Couture and Brock Lesnar. Lesnar defeated Couture by TKO in the second round, earning him the Heavyweight Championship belt in the process and setting him up to face the winner of Nogueira/Mir to unify the belts.

In the fight with Nogueira, Mir showcased vastly improved striking, particularly his boxing, knocking down the Brazilian twice in the first round and once in the second. Herb Dean stopped the match at 1:54 of the second round, declaring Mir the winner. Nogueira's loss marked the first time he had lost a fight due to strikes. In a post-fight interview, Mir credited his improved striking to a drastic improvement in conditioning.

Two days after the fight, Dana White revealed in an interview that "Nogueira had just gotten over a Staph infection." Nogueira himself verified this fact several months later in his own interview, stating that he had a staph infection "20 days before the fight, [requiring] 5 days in the hospital."  When asked if this infection affected his fight, he answered, "For sure." In addition to this illness, his knee was injured during training, for which he had surgery in February 2009. Despite these handicaps, Nogueira offered strong praise for Mir's performance, with particular credit given to Mir's ability to maintain "very good distance."

Heavyweight championship unification
Mir's victory over Nogueira set in place a re-match with the UFC Heavyweight Champion Brock Lesnar for the UFC Heavyweight Championship. However, Mir stated, that in his opinion, holding victories over former UFC Interim Heavyweight Champion Antônio Rodrigo Nogueira at UFC 92 and current UFC Heavyweight Champion Brock Lesnar at UFC 81 is enough to recognize him as the owner of the "real belt." Mir was originally scheduled to fight Lesnar at UFC 98 On May 23, 2009, in Las Vegas, Nevada, however, he sustained a knee injury during training which required arthroscopic surgery and the removal of bone chips from his knee. The rematch against Lesnar was therefore rescheduled for UFC 100 on July 11, 2009. The show would break many UFC records in terms of PPV sales and is in the top 3 best selling UFC PPV of all time.

At UFC 100, Mir was lively on his feet but proved unable to counter Lesnar's wrestling and positional dominance. Lesnar dominated the first round with superior wrestling. In the second round, after being allowed to stand up, Mir landed a combination, ending with a turning right elbow which forced Lesnar to look for a clinch. Mir took this opportunity to attempt a jumping right knee, which landed, but ultimately resulted in Lesnar securing another takedown. After a short period of recovery from the knee, Lesnar pinned Mir up against the cage and delivered multiple unanswered heavy blows to his face, forcing referee Herb Dean to stop the fight via TKO at 1:48 in the second round. With the win, Lesnar became the undisputed UFC Heavyweight Champion.

Mir vs. Kongo
Mir had his next fight against Cheick Kongo on December 12, 2009, at UFC 107. Two months prior to this fight, Mir replaced his striking coach Ken Hahn with boxing trainer Jimmy Gifford. Mir was expected to weigh 20 to 25 lbs heavier than usual, due to the strength and conditioning program that he had undertaken to improve his muscular frame. As expected, Mir weighed in for his fight against Kongo at 264.5 lbs. At the weigh-ins, Kongo refused to face Mir during the traditional stare-down before the fight. During the fight, Mir stunned Kongo with an overhand left early, dropping him and swarming to secure a guillotine choke victory at 1:12 in the first round. Kongo refused to tap and was rendered unconscious by the choke.  In the post-fight press conference, Mir expressed his desire to fight a rubber match with Brock Lesnar. Mir later created controversy after commenting that he wanted to break Lesnar's neck, so that he would become the first mixed martial artist to die in competition. Mir later made an apology for his comments after being admonished by Dana White.

Interim Heavyweight Championship bout
Mir faced Shane Carwin for the UFC Interim Heavyweight Championship on March 27, 2010, at UFC 111. After a brief standup exchange, Carwin pushed Mir against the cage, where he delivered several short uppercuts to Mir's chin. Mir lost the fight via knockout at 3:48 of the first round.

Second rise back to title contention
At a UFC Fan Expo, Mir said he briefly considered dropping down to the Light heavyweight division, although he later confirmed he would remain at Heavyweight. He was expected to face Antônio Rodrigo Nogueira on September 25, 2010, at UFC 119 in a rematch of the Interim Championship bout which Mir won via TKO at UFC 92. Nogueira pulled out of this fight due to knee surgery and was replaced by Mirko Cro Cop. Mir defeated Mirko Cro Cop via third-round knockout, earning the win with a knee from the clinch in a largely uneventful fight in which neither fighter was able to deliver any significant offense.

Mir faced former IFL Heavyweight Champion Roy Nelson on May 28, 2011, at UFC 130. He won via unanimous decision (30–27, 30–27, and 30–26) by using superior control and constant pressure. Mir showed improved wrestling by pushing Nelson against the cage, completing a Judo hip throw and securing several takedowns in the third round. Mir landed several hard knees and elbows from the Muay Thai clinch throughout the bout but was unable to finish the durable Nelson.

 
A rematch with Antônio Rodrigo Nogueira took place on December 10, 2011, at UFC 140. In the bout, Mir was dropped during the first round by a punch from Nogueira, and the bout was nearly stopped. Mir quickly recovered and gained superior positioning, defeating Nogueira by kimura at 3:38 of round 1, snapping Nogueira's arm in the process, as Nogueira refused to tap. Along with being the first fighter to have finished Nogueira via knockout, Mir became the first fighter to have defeated Nogueira via submission in mixed martial arts. The victory also earned Mir Submission of the Night honors. UFC President Dana White called it the "submission of the century" at the post-fight press conference.

Third title shot and beyond
Mir was expected to face Cain Velasquez on May 25, 2012, at UFC 146. However, on April 20, 2012, Dana White announced that Mir would face Brazilian Junior dos Santos for the UFC Heavyweight Championship, replacing kickboxer Alistair Overeem. On May 11, 2012, UFC Primetime returned to promote the fight between Mir and dos Santos, and concluded on May 25. In their fight, dos Santos was able to use superior foot work to strike in and out before Mir could mount any significant offense. Mir lost the fight via TKO in the second round and said he would have to go back to the drawing board to continue his career.

Later in 2012, the UFC announced that Mir had been given a one fight sabbatical to compete under the Strikeforce banner to challenge Strikeforce Heavyweight Grand Prix Tournament Champion Daniel Cormier. The bout with Cormier was expected to take place on November 3, 2012, at Strikeforce: Cormier vs. Mir. However, on September 19 it was revealed that Mir suffered an injury in training and was forced to pull out of the bout. The bout with Cormier was rescheduled for April 20, 2013, at UFC on Fox 7. Mir lost the fight by unanimous decision.

Mir faced returning former UFC Heavyweight Champion Josh Barnett on August 31, 2013, at UFC 164. Mir lost via TKO in the first round.

Mir was scheduled to face Alistair Overeem on November 16, 2013, at UFC 167. However, the pairing was moved to February 1, 2014, at UFC 169. Mir lost the fight via unanimous decision.

Mir was expected to face Antônio Silva on February 28, 2015, at UFC 184. However, the bout with Silva was moved up a week and served as the event headliner for UFC Fight Night 61. Despite being the betting underdog, Mir won the fight via knockout in the first round, dropping Silva with a left hook and finishing him with a barrage of ground and pound. Subsequently, Mir won a Performance of the Night bonus.

Mir faced Todd Duffee at UFC Fight Night 71 on July 15, 2015. He won the fight via knockout in the first round after dropping Duffee with a straight left. Referee "Big" John McCarthy immediately stepped in to stop the fight as Duffee face planted onto the mat. Mir earned his second consecutive Performance of the Night bonus.

Mir faced Andrei Arlovski on September 5, 2015, at UFC 191. He lost the back-and-forth fight via unanimous decision, although some, including UFC president Dana White, scored the fight in his favor. 12 of 15 media outlets, however, scored the bout in favor of Arlovski.

Mir faced Mark Hunt on March 20, 2016, at UFC Fight Night 85 in Brisbane, Australia. He lost the fight via KO in the first round. On April 7, 2016, Mir was notified by the U.S. Anti-Doping Agency (USADA) that the sample he submitted the day of the fight tested positive for oral turinabol metabolites. In a statement, Mir responded, "I don't know how that is possible as I do not take any performance enhancing drugs (PEDs)." He was nonetheless suspended for two years.

Speaking in early 2017 Frank Mir opened up to a radio show about retirement rumors indicating he was still interested in actively competing, and a potential comeback. Mir indicated interest in a third Brock Lesnar fight.

On July 8, 2017, Mir announced that he had been granted his release from the UFC after nearly 16 years with the promotion, despite having six fights left on his contract.

Bellator MMA
On August 16, 2017, it was announced that Mir had signed a multi-fight deal with Bellator MMA.

In his debut fight for the promotion, Mir faced Fedor Emelianenko at Bellator 198 on April 28, 2018. The bout was part of the opening round of the Bellator Heavyweight Tournament. He lost the fight via TKO in round one.

In his second fight for the promotion, Mir faced Javy Ayala at Bellator 212 on December 14, 2018. Mir successfully won the first round by taking Ayala down and controlling him on the ground. However, Ayala rallied in the second round and Mir eventually lost by TKO after tapping to punches that caused an alveolar ridge fracture.

Mir faced Roy Nelson in a rematch of their 2011 UFC bout on October 25, 2019, in the main event of Bellator 231. He won via unanimous decision.

On April 1, 2020, Mir's contract with Bellator expired, making him a free agent.

Professional wrestling
In January 2019, Josh Barnett announced via Twitter that Mir would be making his professional wrestling debut for Game Changer Wrestling's Bloodsport event, an independent wrestling event that features worked matches presented in an MMA style. Mir's debut coincided with WrestleMania 35 weekend on Thursday, April 4. On March 17, it was announced that Mir's debut match would be against former UFC Superfight Champion and former NWA World Heavyweight Champion Dan Severn. Mir defeated Severn, and post-match called out former UFC rival Brock Lesnar.

Professional boxing
On February 25, 2021, Mir announced he would be making his professional boxing debut against former multi-time light heavyweight and cruiserweight boxing champion Antonio Tarver on April 17 on the undercard of Jake Paul vs. Ben Askren. However, on March 23, it was revealed that Tarver was pulled from the bout after failing to meet the requirements to compete put forth by the Georgia Athletic and Entertainment Commission. Mir instead faced former IBF cruiserweight champion Steve Cunningham at the event, losing by unanimous decision.

Triad Combat
On November 27, 2021, Mir faced Kubrat Pulev in the main event of a boxing vs MMA card promoted by Triller that featured other UFC veterans. Mir lost the fight via TKO in the 1st round.

Commentary and opinionist
Frank Mir was a color commentator for World Extreme Cagefighting until the 2010 WEC 47, when he was replaced by Stephan Bonnar. In June 2012, Mir stated in an interview with The Chronicle-Journal that he wants to pursue commentary after he retires from fighting. "I like analyzing fights, and I like doing color commentating," he said. "It's an opportunity I would take advantage of when I run into it. Hopefully it's something I can do full time". Mir was appointed in 2015 the color commentator for Absolute Championship Berkut.

In February 2021 USA TODAY printed an op-ed in which Mir and an executive director of the American Principles Project were opposed to the proposed Equality Act because "Our athlete daughters shouldn't have to compete with transgender women" who take female hormones. They raised the specter "of increased risk of severe injury based on physical differences" and noted that "biological male athletes have an insurmountable physical advantage over biological female athletes". They felt that "the entirety of women's athletics would be deeply imperiled".

Personal life
Mir and his wife Jennifer have three children together, and Jennifer has a son from a previous relationship whom Mir adopted. Frank's oldest biological child, Bella, is also a professional mixed martial artist.

Mir is an atheist and a Libertarian. He followed a vegan diet for a year but switched to a Paleo diet due to lack of energy. He suffers from low testosterone and underwent testosterone replacement therapy from 2012 until its banning from combat sports in 2014.

Frank Mir's daughter, Bella Mir, has also embarked upon a professional MMA career, winning her debut in October, 2020 with her father in her corner.

Mir worked as a bouncer at the Spearmint Rhino in Las Vegas before entering the UFC and continued to work there as Director of Security while pursuing his UFC career. In January 2016, it was announced that Mir would be inducted into the Southern Nevada Sports Hall of Fame. Frank Mir is of Cuban heritage through his father.

Championships and achievements

Mixed martial arts
Ultimate Fighting Championship
UFC Heavyweight Championship (One time)
Interim UFC Heavyweight Championship (One time)
Submission of the Night (Two times) vs. Brock Lesnar and Antônio Rodrigo Nogueira
Performance of the Night (Two times) vs. Antônio Silva and Todd Duffee
Third most wins in UFC Heavyweight division (16)
Second most fights in UFC Heavyweight division (27)
Tied for most finishes in UFC heavyweight division with Derrick Lewis (13)
Second most first round finishes in UFC history (10)
Tied (Gunnar Nelson) for seventh most submission wins in UFC history (8)
Most wins by submission in UFC Heavyweight division (8)
First and only toe hold finish in UFC history
Fastest submission in UFC Heavyweight division (45 seconds)
Fought five different UFC Heavyweight Champions
Defeated three different UFC Heavyweight Champions
2011 Submission of the Year vs. Antônio Rodrigo Nogueira on December 10
 2011 Comeback Of The Year vs Antônio Rodrigo Nogueira on December 10
FIGHT! Magazine
2008 Submission of the Year vs. Brock Lesnar on February 2
Sherdog
2008 Comeback Fighter of the Year
2011 Submission of the Year vs. Antônio Rodrigo Nogueira on December 10
2011 All-Violence Second Team
Mixed Martial Arts Hall of Fame
ESPN
2011 Submission of the Year vs. Antônio Rodrigo Nogueira on December 10
World MMA Awards
2011 Submission of the Year vs. Antônio Rodrigo Nogueira at UFC 140
2011 Comeback of the Year vs. Antônio Rodrigo Nogueira at UFC 140

Submission grappling
Brazilian Jiu-Jitsu
Black belt in Brazilian jiu-jitsu under Ricardo Pires
Pan American Championships
Blue Belt Pesadissimo: 1st place (2001)
North American Grappling Association
NAGA Absolute Division Champion (2007)

Amateur wrestling
Nevada State Wrestling
Nevada State Wrestling Champion (1998)

Mixed martial arts record

|-
|Win
|align=center|19–13
|Roy Nelson
| Decision (unanimous)
|Bellator 231
|
|align=center|3
|align=center|5:00
|Uncasville, Connecticut, United States
|
|-
|Loss
|align=center|18–13
|Javy Ayala
|TKO (submission to punches)
|Bellator 212
|
|align=center|2
|align=center|4:30
|Honolulu, Hawaii, United States
|
|-
|Loss
|align=center|18–12
|Fedor Emelianenko
|KO (punches) 
|Bellator 198
|
|align=center|1
|align=center|0:48
|Rosemont, Illinois, United States
|
|-
|Loss
|align=center|18–11
|Mark Hunt
|KO (punch) 
|UFC Fight Night: Hunt vs. Mir
|
|align=center|1
|align=center|3:01
|Brisbane, Australia
|
|-
|Loss
|align=center|18–10
|Andrei Arlovski
|Decision (unanimous)
|UFC 191
|
|align=center|3
|align=center|5:00
|Las Vegas, Nevada, United States
|
|-
| Win
| align=center| 18–9
| Todd Duffee
| KO (punch) 
| UFC Fight Night: Mir vs. Duffee
| 
| align=center|1
| align=center|1:13
| San Diego, California, United States
| 
|-
| Win
| align=center| 17–9
| Antônio Silva
| KO (elbows)
| UFC Fight Night: Bigfoot vs. Mir
| 
| align=center|1
| align=center|1:40
| Porto Alegre, Brazil
| 
|-
| Loss
| align=center| 16–9
| Alistair Overeem
| Decision (unanimous) 
| UFC 169
| 
| align=center| 3
| align=center| 5:00
| Newark, New Jersey, United States
| 
|-
| Loss
| align=center| 16–8
| Josh Barnett
| TKO (knee)
| UFC 164
| 
| align=center| 1
| align=center| 1:56
| Milwaukee, Wisconsin, United States
| 
|-
| Loss
| align=center| 16–7
| Daniel Cormier
| Decision (unanimous) 
| UFC on Fox: Henderson vs. Melendez
| 
| align=center| 3
| align=center| 5:00
| San Jose, California, United States
| 
|-
| Loss
| align=center| 16–6
| Junior dos Santos
| TKO (punches)
| UFC 146
| 
| align=center| 2 
| align=center| 3:04
| Las Vegas, Nevada, United States
| 
|-
| Win
| align=center| 16–5
| Antônio Rodrigo Nogueira
| Technical Submission (kimura) 
| UFC 140
| 
| align=center| 1
| align=center| 3:38
| Toronto, Ontario, Canada
| 
|-
| Win
| align=center| 15–5
| Roy Nelson
| Decision (unanimous)
| UFC 130
| 
| align=center| 3
| align=center| 5:00
|Las Vegas, Nevada, United States
| 
|-
| Win
| align=center| 14–5
| Mirko Cro Cop
| KO (knee)
| UFC 119
| 
| align=center| 3
| align=center| 4:02
| Indianapolis, Indiana, United States
| 
|-
| Loss
| align=center| 13–5
| Shane Carwin
| KO (punches)
| UFC 111
| 
| align=center| 1
| align=center| 3:48
| Newark, New Jersey, United States
| 
|-
| Win
| align=center| 13–4
| Cheick Kongo
| Technical Submission (guillotine choke)
| UFC 107
| 
| align=center| 1
| align=center| 1:12
| Memphis, Tennessee, United States
| 
|-
|  Loss
| align=center| 12–4
| Brock Lesnar
| TKO (punches)
| UFC 100
| 
| align=center| 2
| align=center| 1:48
| Las Vegas, Nevada, United States
| 
|-
| Win
| align=center| 12–3
| Antônio Rodrigo Nogueira
| TKO (punches)
| UFC 92
| 
| align=center| 2
| align=center| 1:57
| Las Vegas, Nevada, United States
| 
|-
| Win
| align=center| 11–3
| Brock Lesnar
| Submission (kneebar)
| UFC 81
| 
| align=center| 1
| align=center| 1:30
| Las Vegas, Nevada, United States
| 
|-
| Win
| align=center| 10–3
| Antoni Hardonk
| Submission (kimura)
| UFC 74
| 
| align=center| 1
| align=center| 1:17
| Las Vegas, Nevada, United States
| 
|-
| Loss
| align=center| 9–3
| Brandon Vera
| TKO (punches)
| UFC 65
| 
| align=center| 1
| align=center| 1:09
| Sacramento, California, United States
| 
|-
| Win
| align=center| 9–2
| Dan Christison
| Decision (unanimous)
| UFC 61
| 
| align=center| 3
| align=center| 5:00
| Las Vegas, Nevada, United States
| 
|-
| Loss
| align=center| 8–2
| Márcio Cruz
| TKO (punches and elbows)
| UFC 57
| 
| align=center| 1
| align=center| 4:10
| Las Vegas, Nevada, United States
| 
|-
| Win
| align=center| 8–1
| Tim Sylvia
| Technical Submission (armbar)
| UFC 48
| 
| align=center| 1
| align=center| 0:50
| Las Vegas, Nevada, United States
| 
|-
| Win
| align=center| 7–1
| Wes Sims
| KO (punches)
| UFC 46
| 
| align=center| 2
| align=center| 4:21
| Las Vegas, Nevada, United States
| 
|-
| Win
| align=center| 6–1
| Wes Sims
| DQ (kicking a downed opponent)
| UFC 43
| 
| align=center| 1
| align=center| 2:55
| Las Vegas, Nevada, United States
| 
|-
| Win
| align=center| 5–1
| Tank Abbott
| Submission (toe hold)
| UFC 41
| 
| align=center| 1
| align=center| 0:45
| Atlantic City, New Jersey, United States
| 
|-
| Loss
| align=center| 4–1
| Ian Freeman
| TKO (punches)
| UFC 38
| 
| align=center| 1
| align=center| 4:35
| London, England
|
|-
| Win
| align=center| 4–0
| Pete Williams
| Submission (inside shoulder lock)
| UFC 36
| 
| align=center| 1
| align=center| 0:46
| Las Vegas, Nevada, United States
| 
|-
| Win
| align=center| 3–0
| Roberto Traven
| Submission (armbar)
| UFC 34
| 
| align=center| 1
| align=center| 1:05
| Las Vegas, Nevada, United States
| 
|-
|  Win
| align=center| 2–0
| Dan Quinn
| Submission (triangle choke)
| IFC 15
| 
| align=center| 1
| align=center| 2:15
| Oroville, California, United States
| 
|-
| Win
| align=center| 1–0
| Jerome Smith
| Decision (unanimous)
| SF 11
| 
| align=center| 2
| align=center| 5:00
| Evansville, Indiana, United States
|

Pay-per-view Bouts

Professional boxing record

See also
List of male mixed martial artists

References

External links

|-

1979 births
American atheists
American male karateka
American libertarians
American male mixed martial artists
American mixed martial artists of Cuban descent
American Muay Thai practitioners
American people of Russian descent
American people of Moroccan descent
American people of English descent
American people of Welsh descent
American practitioners of Brazilian jiu-jitsu
American sportspeople in doping cases
Doping cases in mixed martial arts
Heavyweight mixed martial artists
Mixed martial artists utilizing American Kenpo
Mixed martial artists utilizing Muay Thai
Mixed martial artists utilizing karate
Mixed martial artists utilizing wrestling
Mixed martial artists utilizing Brazilian jiu-jitsu
Living people
Mixed martial artists from Nevada
Mixed martial arts broadcasters
People awarded a black belt in Brazilian jiu-jitsu
Sportspeople from Las Vegas
Submission grapplers
Ultimate Fighting Championship champions
Ultimate Fighting Championship male fighters
Bellator male fighters